Unexplained or The Unexplained may refer to:
 Unexplained, something not explained 
 Unexplained (EP), a 1992 EP by EMF
 The Unexplained (1996 TV series), a 1990s documentary television series
  Unexplained, a 2008 television series examining paranormal events, with Tony Robinson (Channel 4)
 The Unexplained (magazine)

See also
 
 Medically unexplained physical symptoms
 Sudden unexplained death syndrome
 Unexplained variation/randomness/variance, in statistics, see Explained variation
 Fraction of variance unexplained
 Fort: Prophet of the Unexplained, a 2002 comic book
 Unexplained disappearances
 Unexplained Mysteries, a 2003 documentary television series
 Unexplained Canada, a 2006 documentary television series